Rutoši is a village in the municipality of Nova Varoš, western Serbia. According to the 2002 census, the village has a population of 887 people.

See also
Janja Monastery

References

Populated places in Zlatibor District